Aliidiomarina taiwanensis is a Gram-negative, aerobic, heterotrophic and motile bacterium from the genus of Aliidiomarina which has been isolated from water from the Bitou Harbour in Taiwan.

References

External links
Type strain of Aliidiomarina taiwanensis at BacDive -  the Bacterial Diversity Metadatabase

Bacteria described in 2012
Alteromonadales